Andy Gruenebaum (born December 30, 1982) is a retired American professional soccer goalkeeper. He was selected by the Columbus Crew with the third overall pick in the 2006 MLS Supplemental Draft. He made his MLS debut in 2006.

Career

Amateur
Gruenebaum, who is Jewish, is an Overland Park, Kansas, native.  He was an All-American at Blue Valley North High School. He attended the University of Kentucky, where he recorded 21 shutouts in 66 collegiate games. Gruenebaum earned All-Conference honors and picked up the nickname “The Hebrew Hammer.”
 
Prior to his senior season, Gruenebaum starred for the Des Moines Menace in the USL Premier Development League and was named MVP of the 2005 PDL championship as the Menace won their only title.

Professional

Gruenebaum was selected by the Columbus Crew with the third overall pick in the 2006 MLS Supplemental Draft. He made his MLS debut in May 2006 when Jon Busch suffered a knee injury in a match against D.C. United and started the final two matches of the season.

He started ten matches in the 2007 season, earning his first two career shutouts in back-to-back matches in April. However, his playing time gradually decreased as Will Hesmer established himself as the starting goalkeeper. He made just one league start in 2008 as the Crew won the Supporters' Shield and MLS Cup.

Playing time remained sporadic due to the presence of Hesmer and Gruenebaum's own injuries, but he finally enjoyed a breakout season in 2012, starting 33 matches (including eight shutouts) as Hesmer missed time with injuries. He continued to start in 2013 despite missing time due to injuries.

Following the 2013 season, Gruenenbaum was traded to his hometown club, Sporting Kansas City, in exchange for a 2nd-round pick in the 2016 MLS SuperDraft. After one season in Kansas City, Gruenenbaum's 2015 contract option was declined and he entered the 2014 MLS Re-Entry Draft. He was selected in stage one of the draft by San Jose Earthquakes. However, Gruenenbaum instead opted to retire and take a role as a broadcaster with Sporting.

Career statistics
Sources:

Honors

Des Moines Menace
USL Premier Development League National Champions (1): 2005

Columbus CrewMajor League Soccer MLS Cup (1): 2008Major League Soccer Supporter's Shield (2):''' 2008, 2009

See also
List of select Jewish football (association; soccer) players

References

External links
 

1982 births
Living people
American soccer players
Jewish American sportspeople
Jewish footballers
Kentucky Wildcats men's soccer players
Des Moines Menace players
Columbus Crew players
Sporting Kansas City players
Association football goalkeepers
Columbus Crew draft picks
USL League Two players
Major League Soccer players
Soccer players from Kansas
21st-century American Jews